Éric Boisset (born 8 November 1965 in Valence, Drôme) is a French writer.

Works 
 
 Le Grimoire d'Arkandias, Magnard, . Grand Prix des Jeunes Lecteurs PEEP 1997. Prix des Incorruptibles 1998. Prix des Dévoreurs de Livres 1999.
 Arkandias contre-attaque, Magnard, 
 Le Sarcophage d'outretemps, Magnard, 
 
 Le Secret de tante Eudoxie, Magnard, 2002, 
 L'Œil du mainate, Magnard, 2004, 
 L'Antichambre de Mana, Magnard, 2005, 
 Nicostratos, Magnard, . Prix des Dévoreurs de Livres 1998. Prix Jeunesse du  of Saint-Dié-des-Vosges, 1998.
 , Magnard, 
 , Plon Jeunesse . Prix des Dévoreurs de Livres 2009. Prix Littérature Jeunesse de l'Institut français de Rabat Salé Kénitra (Maroc) 2012.
 , Magnard .
 Les Pierres de fumée - volume 1 : La Prédiction, Magnard, 
 Les Pierres de fumée - volume 2 : La Révélation, Magnard, 
 Les Pierres de fumée - volume 3 : La Rédemption, Magnard,

References

External links 
 Éric Boisset's official website
 Portrait of Éric Boisset on the site of the Charte des auteurs et illustrateurs jeunesse
 Interview + books critics
 Very complete presentation of Éric Boisset's work
 Vidéo réalisée par le CRDP de l'Académie de Caen lors du passage d'Eric Boisset dans cette ville
 Les élèves de 6e du collège Guillaume de Normandie à Caen ont lu La botte secrète d'Eric Boisset on YouTube

20th-century French non-fiction writers
20th-century French male writers
French children's writers
1965 births
People from Valence, Drôme
Living people